Maxim Orlov (born January 31, March 31 or April 15, 1981) is a Russian professional ice hockey forward. He was selected by Washington Capitals in the 8th round (219th overall) of the 1999 NHL Entry Draft.
Orlov has played in the Russian Superleague primarily with HC CSKA Moscow. He is currently playing for Arystan Temirtau in the Kazakhstan Hockey Championship league.

References

External links
 

Arystan Temirtau players
Living people
Washington Capitals draft picks
HC CSKA Moscow players
1981 births
Russian ice hockey forwards